Cañón del Pato (Spanish: Duck Canyon) is on the Rio Santa (Santa River) at the north end of the Callejón de Huaylas (Corridor of Huaylas) in north-central Peru. The mostly rocky canyon walls are too steep and arid for cultivation, and in only a few places are the slopes of the imposingly rugged canyon suitable even for grazing domestic animals. The canyon was formed by the river where the north end of the Cordillera Negra range (to the west) converges with the Cordillera Blanca mountain range (to the east). These two Andean ridges run generally parallel for nearly 140 km from south of the city of Huaraz northward to the Cañón; the Cordillera Blanca continues northward for another hundred kilometers or more. The Callejón de Huaylas is the valley between the two cordilleras averaging about 16 km (measured on a map from the crests of the two ridges) in width but in places as much as 25 km in width.

The main south–north highway through the Callejón de Huaylas existed as a narrow dirt track prior to construction of the highway through the Cañón. Construction of the highway's northward extension began in 1952 at the town of Caraz, about 30 km south of the Cañón. The highway penetrates and traverses the Cordillera Negra. Eventually it descends westward and continues to the Pacific Ocean port city of Chimbote and northward to the city of Trujillo, providing motor vehicle access to the Pacific coast from the Callejón. A typical highway journey from Caraz to the Cañón is about 4hrs round trip. The highway from Caraz to Trujillo covers a distance of 184 km. From Caraz the highway is in the Callejón valley until it crosses a concrete bridge to the west side of the river. Here the highway leaves the valley floor, veers northwest onto the eastern face of the Cordillera Negra, and eventually pierces through to the western face of the mountain. The highway along this entire route is unpaved and has 35 one-lane tunnels before it emerges onto the western face of the Cordillera Negra high above the town of Huallanca. The river from this same bridge goes generally northward through the Cañón itself and eventually its water powers the turbines of the hydro electricity plant at Huallanca.

At approximately the same latitude as that of highway tunnel 18 the nearby (eastward) river's natural banks are as close as 6m apart; the crests of the two cordilleras loom above, at places as high as 6000m above sea level. A short distance north (downstream) of this constriction in the Cañón is a diversion dam that deflects measured amounts of the river's water into a man-made tunnel. From the diversion dam to the Huallanca powerplant the tunnel is about 11 km long. It descends in altitude from the diversion dam to a place about 103m directly above this hydroelectric facility. Diameter of the tunnel was established to accommodate small dump-trucks that removed rock and debris during construction.  At the tunnel's north end the water plunges down into one or both turbines a hundred meters below. The powerplant is entirely within a huge manmade cavity a hundred meters inside the rock of the mountain on the east edge of Huallanca. From Huallanca the river flows westward and furnishes water for irrigation of large banana plantations in the arid coastal plain; just north of Chimbote the river empties into the Pacific Ocean.

The earthquake of 1970 caused so much damage to the railroad bed, that this railway connecting Huallanca and Chimbote was abandoned and has not been in use since.

Canyons and gorges of Peru
Landforms of Ancash Region